Iwan Baan (born February 8, 1975 in Alkmaar) is a Dutch photographer. He has challenged a long-standing tradition of depicting buildings as isolated and static by representing people in architecture and showing the building's environment, trying "to produce more of a story or a feel for a project" and "to communicate how people use the space". He has photographed buildings by many of the world's most prominent architects, including Rem Koolhaas and Toyo Ito. He is "one of the most widely published" photographers in the world. His candid "polysemic shots" have been compared to the work of Diane Arbus.

In 2010, he won the first annual Julius Shulman Photography Award, named after the most famous architectural photographer of the 20th century.
At the 2012 Venice Architecture Biennale he received the Golden Lion for Best Installation. In 2012, he took the image of Manhattan after Hurricane Sandy that made the cover of New York City magazine—showing light above 42nd St. and darkness below that line—illustrating vividly the storm's disparate impact. It was later turned into a limited edition print sold to benefit Sandy's victims. In April 2016, Baan received the AIA New York's Stephen A. Kliment Oculus Award.

Published books
 Momentum of Light 2021, 
 Dudok by Iwan Baan 2021, 
 Atmosphere Anatomies  – On Design, Weather, and Sensation, 2021, 
 Two Sides of the Border, 2020, 
 National Museum of Qatar, 2020, 
 Tatiana Bilbao Estudio, 2019, 
 Justice is beauty, 2019, 
 Serpentine Pavilion 2019 – Junya Ishigami, 
 Balkrishna Doshi: Architecture for the People 2019, 
 Torre Reforma 2019, 
 Baku – Oil and Urbanism 2018, 
 Torre Reforma 2019, 
 Landscape of Faith: Architectural Interventions along the Mexican Pilgrimage Route 2018, 
 Solid Objectives: Order, Edge, Aura 2017, 
 Bengal Stream – The Vibrant Architecture Scene of Bangladesh 2017, 
 LAB – Building a Home for Scientists 2017, 
 SoThe Long Life of Design in Italy: B&B Italia. 50 Years and Beyond 2016, 
 Olafur Eliasson: Riverbed 2015, 
 Olafur Eliasson: Contact 2015, 
 Portman's America & Other Speculations, 2017, 
 African Modernism, 2015, .
 52 Weeks, 52 Cities, 2013, .
 Iwan Baan around the world : diary of a year of architecture, 2011, .
 Diller Scofidio + Renfro : Institute of Contemporary Art (ICA), Boston, 2011, .
 Insular insight : where art and architecture conspire with nature : Naoshima, Teshima, Inujima, 2011, . DAM award.
 Iwan Baan, Brasilia - Chandigarh : Living with Modernity, 2010, .
 Porsche Museum : Delugan Meissl Associated Architects, HG Merz, 2010, .
 The SANAA studios 2006–2008 : learning from Japan : single story urbanism, 2010,  .
 SANAA, Sejima & Nishizawa : New Museum, New York, 2010, .
 Maxxi : Zaha Hadid Architects, 2010, .
 Hamsun, Holl, Hamarøy : literature, Knut Hamsun : architecture, Steven Holl : landscape, Hamarøy, Nordland, 2010, .
  Richard Neutra in Europa : Bauten und Projekte 1960–1970, 2010, .
 Song through 21st century eyes : Yaozhou and Qingbai ceramics, 2009, .
 Maddalena effect : an architectural affair, 2009, .
 Building China Five Projects / Five Stories, 2008, .
  Onze bruggen : opdrachtgeverschap bij bruggen in zes Nederlandse gemeenten, 2007, .
  Perspectief : maakbare geschiedenis, 2007, .

Published videos
 Dutch painters of the Golden Age, 2002,

Exhibitions
 Iwan Baan: 52 Weeks, 52 Cities, Exhibited in Montpellier (2016) Copenhagen (2015), Hamburg (2015), Herford (2013)
 Iwan Baan: The Way We Live, 2013, Perry Rubenstein Gallery, Los Angeles
 Iwan Baan, 2010 autour du monde, journal d'une année d'architecture, 2011, Hyères
 Iwan Baan - Recent Works - Contemporary Architectural Photographs, 2008, London
 Building China Five Projects / Five Stories'', 2008, New York

References

External links
 
 Archdaily articles on Iwan Baan
 

1975 births
Living people
Architectural photographers
Dutch photographers
People from Alkmaar